Tomás Láidir Mac Coisdealbhaigh, Irish soldier and poet, fl. 1660s.

Tomás Láidir Mac Coisdealbhaigh was a member of the Costello family of north Connacht who lost their lands in the Cromwellian confiscations of the 1650s.  He was a descendant of Sir William de Angulo, who died in 1206. His brother was the Rapparee, Colonel Dubhaltach Caoch Mac Coisdealbhaigh.

Biography 
Mac Coisdealbhaigh was in love with Úna Ní Dhiarmaida but her family refused to allow them to marry. After several attempts, Mac Coisdealbhaigh made a last formal proposal, swearing that if he crossed Áth na Donóige (a ford on the Donóige river) on his way home without receiving an answer, he would never marry Úna. "He rode slowly and waited a long time in the ford itself, but finally on the mocking advice of his own servant, he crossed to the opposite bank. A messenger came soon after with news that he had been accepted, but he refused to go back on his oath. Úna died shortly afterward. Tomás killed the servant who gave him the evil counsel, and composed the famous song Úna Bhán."

Clann Coisdealbhaigh (after Mac Fhirbhisigh)

   Jocelyn de Angulo, fl. 1172.
   |
   |
   William de Angulo, aka William Mac Coisdealbhaigh
   |
   |
   Miles Bregach Mac Coisdealbhaigh
   |
   |__
   |                   |                        |
   |                   |                        |
   Hugo, died 1266?      Gilbert Mor              Phillip, fl. 1288.
   |                   |                        |
   |                   |                        |
   Jordan, died 1324?    Gilbert Og, k. 1333.     |              |
   |                   |                        |              |
   |                   |                        Jordan Duff    Baldraithe/Baldrin
   John.               John, fl. 1366.          |              |
                       |                    Mac Jordan Duff    Mac Phillip
                       |
                       Jordan na Bertaighecht
                       |
    ___|_
    |                               |
    |                               |
    Edmond an Machaire, k. 1437.    William
    |
    |_
    |                                   |                                                                            |
    |                                   |                                                                            |
    John Duff, died 1487.                 William                                                                    Walter
    |                                   |                                                                            |
    |                                   |_               |
    Gilleduff                           |                  |                     |               |                 |
    |                                   |                  |                     |               |                 |
    |_                  Walter, k. 1545    John Dubh, fl. 1536.  Jordan Glegil   Hubert            John
    |                |                  |                  |                     |               |                 |
    |                |                  |                  |                     |               |                 |___
    Jordan           John, k. 1536      Rudhraighe         Piers, k. 1555.       William     Gilladuff             |         |
    |                |                                     |                     |               |                 |         |
    |                |                                     |                     |               |    Thomas     Jordan Boy
    Jordan Buidhe    Jordan                                William               David           |     |     |      |        |   
    |                |                                     |                     |               |     |     |      |        |
    |                |___     _|            _|  Edmond John  Walter David  Dubhaltach
    Edmond           |      |               |     |        |            |        |           |        fl. 1586.              |
                     |      |               |     David    Richard      |        |           |                               |
                     John   Jordan Buidhe   William Caech               Edmond   William   Calvach                   Jordan Boy, fl. 1585
                                              k. 1589                                                                        |
    _|
    |                                                      |                           |                                     |
    |                                                      |                           |                                     |
   Tomás Láidir Mac Coisdealbhaigh  Dubhaltach Caoch Mac Coisdealbhaigh                Edmond Dubh                    Calbhach Ban
       fl. 1660s.                         killed 3 March 1667.

Sources 
 pp. 174–175; 400 The New Oxford Book of Irish Verse, edited, with translations, by Thomas Kinsella, 1986.

Irish poets
17th-century Irish-language poets
17th-century births
17th-century deaths
Irish soldiers in the Irish Confederate Wars
Irish outlaws
People from County Mayo
17th-century Irish people